This is a list of college football seasons in which the Baylor Bears have participated. Baylor first began playing football in 1899.  The school has fielded a varsity team every year since 1899, except for the 1906, 1943, and 1944 seasons.

Seasons

Notes

References

External links

Baylor Bears

Baylor Bears football seasons